A9 TV was a Turkish television station that started broadcasting on March 21, 2011 via Turksat satellite television channel broadcasting. Much of the programming includes religious and  English language content, with an emphasis on creationism over evolution and Darwinism. A substantial amount of content features Islamic creationist and cult leader Adnan Oktar (also known as Harun Yahya). In 2018, the channel was fined several times by the country's broadcasting regulator Radio and Television Supreme Council (RTÜK).

Shows 
 Harun Yahya documentaries
 Adnan Oktar'ın sohbet programları (Adnan Oktar's talk shows)  (Turkish, English)
 Building Bridges (features opinion leaders from around the world)
 Ahir Zaman ve Yaratılış Delilleri (The End Times and the evidence of Creation)
 İttihad-ı İslam (Islamic Union)
 Adil Yargı
 Documentaries for Children

References

External links

A9 TV YouTube Channel 
A9 TV Turkey at LyngSat Address

Defunct television channels in Turkey
Television channels and stations established in 2011
Television channels and stations disestablished in 2018